John "Jack" Arthur Spargo (born June 3, 1931) is an American water polo player who competed in the 1952 Summer Olympics. He was born in Hermosa Beach, California.  He graduated from El Segundo High School. He played college water polo for the UCLA Bruins serving for a time as team captain. Spargo was a member of the American water polo team which finished fourth in the 1952 tournament. He played five matches. In 1981, he was inducted into the USA Water Polo Hall of Fame.

References

External links
 

1931 births
Living people
El Segundo High School alumni
UCLA Bruins men's water polo players
American male water polo players
Olympic water polo players of the United States
Water polo players at the 1952 Summer Olympics